The Battle of the Smala was fought in 1843 between France and Algerian resistance fighters during the French conquest of Algeria.  The French, led by Henri d'Orléans, Duke of Aumale, raided the personal encampment ( zmala) of Algerian resistance leader Emir Abdelkader al-Jazairi on 16 May 1843 while al-Qadir was absent on a raiding expedition.  The 500 French cavalrymen surprised the camp defenders, who fired a single volley before scattering. More than 3000 of al-Qadir's followers out of a camp population of 30,000 were captured, as were many of his possessions, including his war chest and a library valued at £5000. Three days later, another 2500 followers were captured.

Al-Qadir fled to Morocco later that year, triggering French pressure on Morocco and the advent of the Franco-Moroccan War in 1844. He was eventually captured in 1847, ending major Algerian resistance to the French colonial occupation.

External links
The Tricolor on the Atlas
The life of Abdel Kader

Battles involving France
Battles involving Algeria
French Algeria
1843 in Algeria
Conflicts in 1843
19th century in Africa
May 1843 events